The 2012 season was Pakhtakors 21st season  in the top Uzbek League in Uzbekistan. Pakhtakor competed in Uzbek League, Uzbek Cup and AFC Champions League tournaments.

Club

Current technical staff

Players

Squad

Transfers

Winter 2011-12

In:

Out:

Summer 2012

In:

Out:

Pre-season matches

Competitions
Pakhtakor competed in all major competitions: 2012 Uzbek League, the 2012 Uzbek Cup and the 2012 AFC Champions League.

Uzbek League

League table

Matches

Uzbek Cup

Matches

AFC Champions League

Group stage

Matches

Squad statistics

Top Scorers

References

External links
 F.C. Pakhtakor official website
 Championat.uz 

Pakhtakor Tashkent FK seasons
Pakhtakor